Jevon Balfour (born December 3, 1994) is a Canadian wrestler. He won a silver medal at the 2014 Commonwealth Games, a bronze medal at the 2018 Commonwealth Games and a bronze medal at the 2019 Pan American Games. He finished in 7th place at the 2014 World Junior Wrestling Championships. Five time Canadian National Champion.

References

External links
 

1994 births
Living people
Canadian male sport wrestlers
Commonwealth Games silver medallists for Canada
Commonwealth Games bronze medallists for Canada
Commonwealth Games medallists in wrestling
Sportspeople from Scarborough, Toronto
Wrestlers at the 2014 Commonwealth Games
Wrestlers at the 2018 Commonwealth Games
Wrestlers at the 2015 Pan American Games
Pan American Games medalists in wrestling
Pan American Games bronze medalists for Canada
Medalists at the 2019 Pan American Games
20th-century Canadian people
21st-century Canadian people
Medallists at the 2014 Commonwealth Games
Medallists at the 2018 Commonwealth Games